The Clark Street Bridge is a bascule bridge that spans the Chicago River in downtown Chicago, connecting the Near North Side with The Loop via Clark Street.

History

The current bridge, which was completed in 1929, is the eighth bridge to span the river at this point. In 1853 the bridge was struck by a steamer, called the London, and collapsed, blocking traffic on the river. The bridge was dredged and river traffic resumed on September 8, 1853.  In 1854, the city approved an expenditure of $12,000 to replace the bridge with a pivot bridge. During the Lager Beer Riot in 1855, the bridge was pivoted to help contain the rioters.

On June 26, 1907, the steamer  collided with the south abutment of the bridge and sank. She was declared a total loss.

The passenger ship  was scheduled to sail from the dock at the Clark Street Bridge when she capsized on July 24, 1915, killing 844 people.

In March 2012, an unidentified man jumped from the bridge and was rescued by local high school students on a field trip. He later died of hypothermia.

In popular culture
In 1916, Carl Sandburg wrote the poem "Clark Street Bridge."

See also
List of bridges documented by the Historic American Engineering Record in Illinois

References

External links

1929 establishments in Illinois
Bascule bridges in the United States
Bridge disasters caused by collision
Bridge disasters in the United States
Bridges completed in 1929
Bridges in Chicago
Historic American Engineering Record in Chicago
Road bridges in Illinois
Transportation disasters in Illinois